The Romanian Wolves (Romanian: Lupii României) is a professional Romanian rugby union team that competes annually in the Eastern Conference of the Rugby Europe Super Cup, alongside RC Batumi and The Black Lion of Georgia as well as Tel Aviv Heat of Israel.

History

Current squad

Current coaching staff
The current coaching staff of the Romanian Wolves:

Results and statistics

European Shield

European Challenge Cup / European Rugby Challenge Cup

Rugby Europe Super Cup

See also
 :Category:București Wolves players
 Romania national rugby union team
 Rugby union in Romania

Romanian rugby union teams
Rugby clubs established in 2004
Sport in Bucharest
2004 establishments in Romania
Rugby Europe Super Cup